Birth of Joy is a Dutch rock band, founded in 2005 at the Utrecht-based Herman Brood Academy. After many live concerts in the Netherlands, the band was signed by Dutch indie label Suburban Records following a performance at the Zwarte Cross Festival 2011. After further shows at the Rencontres Trans Musicales in France and the Eurosonic Noorderslag festival in Groningen, supported by Rockpalast, the group became known outside the Netherlands. The band played their (provisional) last concert on 3 January 2019 in Paradiso, Amsterdam, after more than 1300 live performances in the Netherlands, Europe and the US.

Music
The band's music is influenced by the blues and psychedelic rock scene of the late 1960s and early 1970s, but also borrowing from rock 'n' roll and boogie-woogie.

The band chose L'Ubu club in Rennes, France (city of the Rencontres Trans Musicales) to record a live album during two evenings (29 and 30 January 2015).

Band name
The band's name is a reference to Friedrich Nietzsche's The Birth of Tragedy.

Discography
 Make Things Happen (CD, 2010, self-published)
 Make Things Happen (EP, 2011 Suburban Records)
 Make Things Happen (CD, 2011, Suburban Records, new cover design)
 Life in Babalou (LP + CD, 2012 Suburban Records)
 The Sound of Birth of Joy  (Compilation, CD, 2013, Modulor / Grand Palais)
 Prisoner (LP + CD, 2014, SPV/Long Branch, Suburban Records)
 Live at Ubu (3LP + 2CD, 2015)
 Get Well (LP + CD, 2016, Suburban Records)
 Hyper Focus (LP, 2018, Glitterhouse Records)

References

External links
 
 

Dutch rock music groups
Long Branch Records artists